Robert Douglas Shaw (born 27 December 1932) is a British hurdler. He competed in the men's 400 metres hurdles at the 1956 Summer Olympics. Shaw won a bronze medal for Wales in the 440 yards hurdles at the 1954 British Empire and Commonwealth Games.

References

1932 births
Living people
Athletes (track and field) at the 1956 Summer Olympics
Welsh male hurdlers
Olympic athletes of Great Britain
Athletes (track and field) at the 1954 British Empire and Commonwealth Games
Athletes (track and field) at the 1958 British Empire and Commonwealth Games
Commonwealth Games bronze medallists for Wales
Commonwealth Games medallists in athletics
People from Taff's Well
Sportspeople from Rhondda Cynon Taf
Medallists at the 1954 British Empire and Commonwealth Games